Kalmyk Autonomous Oblast (AO) (Kalmyk: Хальмг Автономн Таңhч, Xaľmg Awtonomn Tañhç) was an autonomy of the Kalmyk people within the Russian SFSR that existed at two separate periods.

It was first established in November 1920. Its administrative center was Astrakhan.  In June 1928, it was included into Lower Volga Krai.  In January 1934, Lower Volga Krai was split into Saratov Krai and Stalingrad Krai, and Kalmyk AO was included as a part of the latter.  In October 1935, Kalmyk AO was raised in status and became the Kalmyk ASSR (abolished in 1943).

Kalmyk Autonomous Oblast was re-established again in January 1957, this time as part of Stavropol Krai. In 1958, it was raised in status, becoming the Kalmyk ASSR, and separated from Stavropol Krai.

Autonomous oblasts of the Soviet Union
States and territories established in 1920
1920 establishments in Russia
1958 disestablishments in the Soviet Union